Elections to Tonbridge and Malling Borough Council were held on 3 May 2007. The whole borough council (53 members) were up for election. Parish council elections were held on the same day.

Overall results

References

2007 English local elections
Tonbridge and Malling Borough Council elections
2000s in Kent